Empty Sky is the official New Jersey September 11 memorial to the state's victims of the September 11 attacks on the United States. It is located in Liberty State Park in Jersey City at the mouth of Hudson River across from the World Trade Center site. Designed by Jessica Jamroz and Frederic Schwartz, it was dedicated on Saturday, September 10, 2011, a day before the tenth anniversary of the attacks.

Design
The design was chosen by unanimous vote of the Families and Survivors Memorial Committee,, out of 320 qualified entries in the inter national design competition . The memorial is dedicated to 746 New Jerseyans killed in the World Trade Center in 1993 and in the September 11 attacks, as well as those who died on September 11, 2001, at the Pentagon and in Shanksville, Pennsylvania.  The New Jersey 9/11 Memorial Foundation has stated that the goal of this memorial is to "reflect the legacies of those whose lives were lost, that their unfulfilled dreams and hopes may result in a better future for society. Their unique qualities and characteristics enriched our lives immeasurably and through this memorial, their stories live on.
The memorial includes twin walls, transecting a "gently sloped mound anchored by a granite path that is directed toward Ground Zero. The name of each of the 746 victims is etched in stainless steel in  letters. A granite passage is oriented to face the site of the twin towers. The name of the memorial is taken from the Bruce Springsteen song "Empty Sky", which is about the "empty sky" where the towers once stood.

Frederic Schwartz, who co-authored the design with Jessica Jamroz, stated that he "listened to the needs and aspirations of the victims' relatives, friends and co-workers," and did not arrive "with a preconceived aesthetic approach." Schwartz who, along with Jamroz, also created The Rising, the Westchester County, New York September 11 memorial, stated that "You start over each time. ... You do serious research, delve into the site, into the problem."

Some observers noted that the memorial is "reminiscent of Maya Lin's Vietnam War memorial in Washington," with its walls filled with names, listed within easy reach and engraved deeply enough to make hand rubbings possible, but one of the many differences between that design and this one will be the way the memorial visually connects New Jersey with the skyline of New York - with the memorial walls symbolic of the felled twin towers across the Hudson River.

Controversy
Plans for the memorial were met with some controversy, and a non-profit advocacy group for Liberty State Park called "Friends of Liberty State Park" (FOLSP) filed a lawsuit to halt the project. The group stated that the memorial would block "panoramic Manhattan views," and that it should not be built or should be relocated to an area near the 750-tree "Grove of Remembrance," an existing memorial to 9/11 victims.  In addition to the concern that the views of Manhattan would be blocked, Sam Pesin, president of FOLSP, stated that the "main message" the group wanted to make clear is that "the governor, in this severe economic crisis, is wasting...taxpayers' money."
Pesin's father, Sam, was one of the park's original founders, in 1976.

Some of those in favor of the memorial called the action of the FOLSP a "frivolous lawsuit," and in November 2009 the Appellate Division of New Jersey Superior Court ruled in favor of the state's plans for the memorial. A spokesperson for Governor Jon Corzine said the memorial that will be erected is the "result of an open public process," and Andrew Pratt, a spokesperson for the New Jersey Department of Treasury, said in 2010, shortly before the 9th anniversary of the attack, that the state was moving forward "aggressively" to ensure the memorial would be completed by the 10th anniversary in September 2011.

Construction
Funding for the memorial was provided by the state, the Port Authority of New York and New Jersey, and the New Jersey Building Association.

Construction bids twelve million dollars higher than the projected cost of the memorial (due to the international spike in the price of stainless steel) resulted in a construction delay in 2007.

Construction began in May 2009, with a push to complete the memorial by August 15, 2011, in time for its scheduled September 11, 2011 dedication.  Although the inside of the walls remained stainless steel, changes to the original design include a plan to use "architecturally finished concrete" for the outside surfaces, so that it will look more attractive than the "flat, drab coating of most concrete finishes."

Dedication
Dedication ceremonies took place September 10, 2011 and were attended by a number of notable political figures, including Governor Chris Christie of New Jersey, five former governors of the state, presidential advisor John O. Brennan, Senators Frank Lautenberg and Robert Menendez and family members of those whose names are inscribed on the monument.

See also

 List of public art in Jersey City, New Jersey
 The Rising (memorial)
 To the Struggle Against World Terrorism
 Liberation (Holocaust memorial)
 Memorials and services for the September 11 attacks

References

External links

 Empty Sky 9/11 Memorial. Liberty State Park. Retrieved November 6, 2011.
 Artist's rendering "State sees November start for construction of 9/11 memorial in Jersey City". NJ.com. September 3, 2010.

Monuments and memorials in New Jersey
Memorials for the September 11 attacks
Tourist attractions in Jersey City, New Jersey
Buildings and structures in Jersey City, New Jersey
Buildings and structures in Hudson County, New Jersey
Outdoor sculptures in New Jersey
Steel sculptures in New Jersey
2011 sculptures
Public art in Jersey City, New Jersey